Katie Lynn Leclerc is an American actress and producer. She has appeared on several television series, including Veronica Mars, Fashion House, Community and The Big Bang Theory. In 2011, she was cast in the television show Switched at Birth, starring as Daphne Vasquez.

Personal life

Leclerc was born in San Antonio, Texas, and grew up in Lakewood, Colorado. She is of Canadian descent. She is the youngest of three siblings. She started learning American Sign Language at 17, before she found out she had Ménière's disease, which leads to hearing loss. Her older sister also teaches ASL. Both her father and older sister have Ménière's disease as well.

Leclerc married longtime boyfriend Brian Habecost, a real estate salesman, on September 6, 2014. In July 2017, Leclerc filed for divorce from her husband.

Career
Leclerc discovered her passion for acting in seventh grade when she got the lead role in a production of Annie. She then moved to San Diego, to pursue theatre at Valley Center High School. She took part in commercials for Pepsi, Cingular, Comcast, and GE. 
"My agent submitted me for a nationwide casting call for the roles of Emmett and Daphne. I ended up getting a callback, and that's when I was asked to try a "deaf accent." It's something we discussed in depth. We wanted to make sure my portrayal was respectful and done correctly. At the same time, we felt that using a Deaf accent would be a really strong choice for the character.

Filmography

Film

Television

Awards and nominations

References

External links

 

21st-century American actresses
Actresses from Colorado
Actresses from San Antonio
American film actresses
American people of French-Canadian descent
American television actresses
Living people
People from Lakewood, Colorado
People from Valley Center, California
People with Ménière's Disease
Year of birth missing (living people)